Martin Bohman (born April 5, 1980 in Prague) is a Czech bobsledder who has competed since 2006. He finished 16th in the four-man event at the 2010 Winter Olympics in Vancouver.

Bohman finished 14th in the four-man event at the FIBT World Championships 2009 in Lake Placid, New York.

His father is sprinter Luděk Bohman and his brother sprinter Ludvík Bohman.

References

External links
 
 

1980 births
Bobsledders at the 2010 Winter Olympics
Czech male bobsledders
Living people
Olympic bobsledders of the Czech Republic
Sportspeople from Prague